Love Designer  is a 2020 Chinese television series, starring Dilraba Dilmurat and Huang Jingyu. It premiered on Hunan TV from May 19 to June 21, 2020.

Synopsis 

Fashion designer Zhou Fang and a boss of an e-commerce company Song Li meet because of a commercial lawsuit, but they were forced to cooperate because of the ties between life and work. The two stubborn people collided with each other and the contradictions were overwhelming. But they grew up in each other's strengths, and at the same time found the inner part of each other and gradually fell in love.

Cast and characters 
Main cast
 Dilraba Dilmurat as Zhou Fang, a fashion designer. She is independent and smart.
 Huang Jingyu as Song Lin, a boss of an e-commerce company. He became a much more open person after Zhou Fang appeared in his life.

Supporting cast
 Zhang Xinyu as Qin Qing, Zhou Fang's best friend, and Zuo Yulin's girlfriend.
 Yi Da Qian as Zuo Yulin, Song Lin's friend, and Qin Qing's boyfriend.
 Hu Bing as Su Yushan, Song Lin's competitor. The brand ‘April’ is very important to him.
 Zheng Shui Jing as Song Luo, Song Lin's younger sister. She starts off as a very naughty and rebellious student with bad grades but matures after she becomes best friends with Shen Di.

Ratings 
 Highest ratings are marked in red, lowest ratings are marked in blue

References 

2020 Chinese television series debuts
Chinese romance television series
Hunan Television dramas
Workplace television series